Douglas ("Doug") Fernández (born November 22, 1959) is a retired male decathlete from Venezuela. His major achievement was winning the silver medal at the 1983 Pan American Games in Caracas. He represented his native country at the 1984 Summer Olympics in Los Angeles, California, finishing in 18th place.

Achievements

References
 1983 Year Ranking
 sports-reference

1959 births
Living people
Venezuelan decathletes
Athletes (track and field) at the 1983 Pan American Games
Pan American Games silver medalists for Venezuela
Athletes (track and field) at the 1984 Summer Olympics
Olympic athletes of Venezuela
Pan American Games medalists in athletics (track and field)
Place of birth missing (living people)
Medalists at the 1983 Pan American Games
20th-century Venezuelan people
21st-century Venezuelan people